Duke of Clarence is a substantive title which has been traditionally awarded to junior members of the British Royal Family. All three creations were in the Peerage of England.

The title was first granted to Lionel of Antwerp, the second son of King Edward III, in 1362, as he had married a de Clare heiress with estates including Clare in Suffolk. Since he died without sons, the title became extinct.

The title was again created in favour of Thomas of Lancaster, the second son of King Henry IV, in 1412. Upon his death, too, the title became extinct.

The last creation in the Peerage of England was for George Plantagenet, brother of King Edward IV, in 1461. The Duke forfeited his title in 1478, after he had been convicted of treason against his brother. He allegedly met his end by being drowned in a butt of Malmsey (according to William Shakespeare).

A fourth creation in England was suggested and planned to take effect; the title of Duke of Clarence was going to be given to Lord Guilford Dudley, husband of Lady Jane Grey, upon her coronation, as she declined to make her husband king. However, she was deposed before this could take effect.

Two double dukedoms, of Clarence and St Andrews and of Clarence and Avondale, were later created for British royal princes. The title also took the form of an earldom for Queen Victoria's son Prince Leopold, Duke of Albany, and his son Prince Charles Edward, the Clarence earldom being a subsidiary title.

Nomenclature
The title does not refer to the minor River Clarence in Pas-de-Calais, northern France, but is said by Polydore Vergil to originate from the manor and castle of Clare in Suffolk, the caput of a feudal barony, which was held by Lionel of Antwerp, 1st Duke of Clarence, in right of his wife, the heiress Elizabeth de Burgh, 4th Countess of Ulster, ultimate descendant and heiress of the previous holder, the de Clare family; Clare was among the many estates which she brought to her husband. After the Union of the Crowns in 1603, the holders of the title were also given titles named after Scottish places: St Andrews and Avondale.

Duke of Clarence, first creation (1362)
The title was first created for Lionel, a younger son of King Edward III who in 1352 had married Elizabeth de Burgh, 4th Countess of Ulster, the sole heiress via a female line of Gilbert de Clare, 8th Earl of Gloucester. The name Clarence referred to the feudal barony of Clare in Suffolk, and as the holder of it (and others) by right of his wife Lionel was given that title.

| Lionel of Antwerp, 1st Duke of Clarence
| 
| 29 November 1338Antwerp, Duchy of Brabant (now Belgium)son of Edward III of England and Philippa of Hainault
| Elizabeth de Burgh, 4th Countess of Ulster13521 child
| 7 October 1368Alba, Piedmontaged 29

|}

Died without male issue.

Duke of Clarence, second creation (1412)

| Thomas of Lancaster, 1st Duke of Clarence
| 
| Autumn 1387son of Henry IV of England and Mary de Bohun
| Margaret Holland1411
| 22 March 1421Battle of Baugé, Anjou, Franceaged 33

|}

Died without legitimate male issue.

Duke of Clarence, third creation (1461)

| George Plantagenet, 1st Duke of Clarence
| 
| 21 October 1449Dublin Castle, Irelandson of Richard Plantagenet, 3rd Duke of York and Cecily Neville, Duchess of York
| Isabel NevilleJuly 14694 children
| 18 February 1478Tower of London, Londonaged 28

|}

Executed for treason in 1478 and honours forfeited.

Similar titles

Earls of Clarence (1881)
 The Prince Leopold, 1st Duke of Albany, 1st Earl of Clarence & 1st Baron Arklow (1853–1884), fourth son of Queen Victoria.
 Charles Edward, Duke of Saxe-Coburg and Gotha, 2nd Duke of Albany, 2nd Earl of Clarence & 2nd Baron Arklow (1884–1954), posthumous son of the 1st Earl, had his British titles suspended in 1919 for waging war against Britain.
For heirs to the suspended peerages, see Duke of Albany.

Duke of Clarence and St Andrews (1789)

William IV (1765–1837), who became king in 1830, at which point the title merged with the Crown.

Duke of Clarence and Avondale (1890)

Prince Albert Victor, 1st Duke of Clarence and Avondale (1864–1892)

Family Tree

Possible future creations
The Dukedom is currently vacant. While there was some speculation that it was one of the options available for Prince Harry upon his wedding with Meghan Markle, press reports also noted the Dukedom's chequered past, including scandals and unfounded rumours of criminality related to Prince Albert Victor.  Prince Harry was ultimately awarded the Dukedom of Sussex.

References

 
Extinct dukedoms in the Peerage of England
Noble titles created in 1362
Noble titles created in 1412
Noble titles created in 1461